Gismondi is an Italian surname. Notable people with the surname include:

Italo Gismondi (1887–1974), Italian archaeologist
Marcelo Gismondi, Argentine rower
Michele Gismondi (1931–2013), Italian cyclist
Paolo Gismondi (1612–1685), Italian Baroque painter

Italian-language surnames